Koulfoua is an island on Lake Chad in Chad.

In summer 2015, thousands of Nigerian refugees settled on the island, fleeing Boko Haram. In December 2015, was attacked by suicide bombers.

References

Lake Chad
Islands of Africa